Topping Cone is an exposed volcanic cone near Cape Crozier, located 1.75 nautical miles (3.2 km) northwest of the summit of The Knoll in eastern Ross Island. Named by New Zealand Antarctic Place-Names Committee (NZ-APC) for W.W. Topping, geologist with Victoria University of Wellington Antarctic Expedition (VUWAE) which examined the cone in the 1969–70 season.

Volcanoes of Ross Island